Mozambique is a multilingual country. A number of Bantu languages are indigenous to Mozambique. Portuguese, inherited from the colonial period (see: Portuguese Mozambique), is the official language, and Mozambique is a full member of the Community of Portuguese Language Countries. Ethnologue lists 43 languages spoken in the country.

According to INE, the National Institute of Statistics of Mozambique, Portuguese is the most widely spoken language in Mozambique: according to the 2007 national population and housing census, 50.4% of the national population aged 5 and older (80.8% of people living in urban areas and 36.3% in rural areas) are fluent in the language. The 2017 national population and housing census found out that Portuguese is spoken by 47.3% of all Mozambicans aged 5 and older, with native speakers making up 16.6% of the population (38.3% in the cities and 5.1% in rural areas, respectively) Mozambique has 22 Bantu origin languages which are: Swahili, Makhuwa, Sena, Ndau, Tswa-Ronga (Tsonga), Lomwe, Ekoti, Nahara, Makonde, Chopi, Chuwabu, Ronga, Kimwani, Nhungwe, Chimanika, Shona, Chiyao, Chichewa, Bitonga, Ngoni, Tswa and Chitewe. The language of the deaf community is Mozambican Sign Language.

Small communities of Arabs, Chinese, and Indians (primarily the Gujarati language) speak their own languages (Indians from Portuguese India speak any of the Portuguese Creoles of their origin) aside from Portuguese as their second language.

Article 9 of Mozambique's constitution provides for the recognition of national languages and that such languages be considered of "cultural and educational heritage" and that the state "shall promote their development and increasing use as languages that convey our identity". Portuguese is deemed the country's official language by article 10.

Sociolinguistics

Multilingualism

Most Mozambicans speak more than one language. According to the Mozambican MINEDH, primary education was become fully bilingual, starting in 2017, and included 16 Mozambican languages, followed by Portuguese as a foreign language. According to the 2007 census about 50.4% of all people aged 5 and older speak Portuguese, and 10.7%, including people of Portuguese ancestry and mestiços, speak it as their first language. Use of the Portuguese language remains strongly concentrated to the urban population of Mozambique along the coast.

Linguistic geography
The map shows the dominant language by region.

Influence among languages
Many indigenous languages of Mozambique have loan words of Portuguese origin.

Largest language groups

References

External links
 Ethnologue Listing of Mozambican Languages
 Línguas de Moçambique – A Portuguese-language collection of publications in Mozambican languages. (A Google Translate Gadget is available)